The Musk family is a wealthy family that is largely active in the United States and Canada. The Musks are of Anglo-Canadian, English, Swiss, and Dutch descent. The family is known for its entrepreneurial endeavors.

History
The family traces its origins to England, where the surname was adopted by Elon Musk's paternal ancestors in the 15th century. The family was part of the small number of British immigrants to South Africa in the early-to-mid twentieth century; Elon's paternal great-grandmother was descended from Dutch Free Burghers, while his maternal great-grandparent came from Switzerland. His maternal grandfather moved from Canada to South Africa around 1950.

Notable members
 Elon Musk (born 1971), entrepreneur and business magnate, CEO of SpaceX, Tesla and Twitter. He was the richest person in the world in 2022 and Time Magazine 2021 Person of the Year.
 Errol Musk (born 1946), South African electromechanical engineer, pilot, sailor, and consultant; father of Elon Musk.  Errol was a property developer in South Africa, developing locations like emerald mines.
 Justine Musk (née Wilson; born 1972), Canadian author and former wife of Elon Musk.
 Kimbal Musk (born 1972), entrepreneur, philanthropist, and restaurateur. He founded Zip2 in 1998 with his brother Elon Musk and later sold it to Compaq for $307 million. He is the co-founder and chairman of Big Green.
 Maye Musk (née Haldeman; born 1948), model and dietitian. She has appeared on the cover of several magazines, including a Time magazine health edition, Women's Day, and Vogue; mother of Elon Musk.
 Tosca Musk (born 1974), filmmaker and sister of Elon Musk; she is the co-founder of Passionflix, an OTT entertainment streaming platform and production company.
 Lyndon Rive (born 1977), businessman who co-founded SolarCity and served as its CEO until 2017. He is a cousin to Elon through his mother Kaye Rive, Maye Musk's twin.
 Michael Musk (born 1952), dermatologist, younger brother of Errol Musk, uncle of Elon Musk.

References

Elon Musk
American people of South African descent
Musk family
American families
Canadian families
South African families